Domino Suzy Kirke-Badgley (born 17 December 1983) is a British-American singer.

Life and career
Kirke is of English and Iraqi-Jewish heritage. She was named after Domino Harvey, whom her mother met when Harvey was a young girl. The Kirke family are a junior branch of a family of Nottinghamshire landed gentry, and descend also from the Gibson-Craig baronets. Kirke's maternal grandmother was Israeli.

Domino was trained musically by her father Simon Kirke, the drummer for Free and Bad Company. From the age of nine, she sang in choirs, operas, and plays before moving to New York City, where she attended Fiorello H. LaGuardia High School to study classical voice and piano.

Her mother, Lorraine, ran the Geminola boutique in SoHo, and her sisters, Lola Kirke and Jemima Kirke, are actresses. Her maternal grandfather was property investor, Jack Dellal.

After being spotted at a Joe's Pub performance at age 17 by producer Andres Levin, Kirke was signed to his label, Fun Machine. Shortly thereafter, she joined forces with Jordan Galland, and formed the band DOMINO, which recorded an EP with Mark Ronson and toured for three years with the likes of Gang of Four and Lily Allen.The band was also featured in Lena Dunham's indie movie Tiny Furniture. The video for their song "Green Umbrella", directed by Galland, won Best Musical Form at the 2006 Da Vinci Film and Video Festival.

"The Guard" was produced by Domino, Timo Ellis, and Jorge Elbrecht and was recorded in Williamsburg, Brooklyn.

Personal life
In 2009, she gave birth to a son with musician Morgan O'Kane.

In 2014, Kirke began a relationship with actor and musician Penn Badgley. They married in a New York courthouse on 27 February 2017. In February 2020, Kirke and Badgley announced they were expecting their first child together after suffering two miscarriages.

On 20 September 2020, Kirke announced via her Instagram account that she had given birth to a son.

Entrepreneurial endeavors
Domino became a doula around 2009 and co-founded a doula business collective, Carriage House Birth. In November 2021, she, along with entrepreneur Joanna Griffiths, released Life After Birth: Portraits of Love and the Beauty of Parenthood, a book about the experiences of postpartum mothers.

Discography
Everyone Else Is Boring EP (2006, download; 2007, Allido)
Mark Ronson Presents Hard Rock compilation (2007, Hard Rock Café) (song: "Tropical Moonlight")
Adults Only (2010)
The Guard EP (2012, download)
Beyond Waves (2017)

References

Living people
American pop rock singers
American people of Iraqi-Jewish descent
American people of Israeli descent
American people of Scottish descent
English people of Iraqi-Jewish descent
English people of Israeli descent
English people of Scottish descent
British people of Iraqi-Jewish descent
British people of Israeli descent
Jewish American musicians
Singers from London
Singers from New York City
Year of birth missing (living people)
21st-century American women singers
21st-century English women singers
21st-century English singers
21st-century American singers
21st-century American Jews
English Ashkenazi Jews
American Sephardic Jews
American Mizrahi Jews
English Sephardi Jews
1983 births